The 1962 San Jose State Spartans football team represented San Jose State College during the 1962 NCAA University Division football season.

San Jose State played as an Independent in 1962. The team was led by sixth-year head coach Bob Titchenal, and played home games at Spartan Stadium in San Jose, California. The Spartans finished with a record of two wins, eight losses, and one tie (2–8–1),  and was outscored 133 to 261.

Schedule

Team players in the NFL/AFL
No San Jose State players were selected in the 1963 NFL Draft or 1963 AFL Draft.

Notes

References

External links
 Game program: San Jose State at Washington State – September 22, 1962

San Jose State
San Jose State Spartans football seasons
San Jose State Spartans football